Craspedoxantha bafut is a species of tephritid or fruit flies in the genus Craspedoxantha of the family Tephritidae.

Distribution
Nigeria, Cameroon.

References

Tephritinae
Insects described in 1990
Diptera of Africa